Toponica may refer to several villages in Serbia:

 Toponica (Bela Palanka)
 Toponica (Gadžin Han)
 Toponica (Knić)
 Toponica (Malo Crniće)
 Toponica (Žitorađa)